Goujon may refer to:
 Goujon (automobile), a French automobile, 1896–1901
 Goujon (food), a small deep-fried strip of fish or meat

People with the surname
 Jean Goujon  (c. 1510 – c. 1565), French Renaissance sculptor
 Jean Goujon (cyclist) (1914–1991), French cyclist
 Jean-Marie Claude Alexandre Goujon (1766–1795), politician of the French Revolution
 Philippe Goujon (born 1954), French politician